Sirkovo is a village in the municipality of Rosoman, North Macedonia.

Demographics
According to the statistics of the Bulgarian ethnographer Vasil Kanchov from 1900, 1471 inhabitants lived in Sirkovo, 1400 Muslim Bulgarians, 60 Christian Bulgarians and 11 Romani. On the 1927 ethnic map of Leonhard Schulze-Jena, the village is shown as a fully Muslim Bulgarian village. According to the 2002 census, the village had a total of 603 inhabitants. Ethnic groups in the village include:

Macedonians 474
Serbs 127
Others 2

References

Villages in Rosoman Municipality